Elise Ng, (born February, 1981 in Kowloon) is a professional squash player who represented Hong Kong. She reached a career-high world ranking of World No. 35 in January 2008.

References

External links 

Hong Kong female squash players
Living people
1981 births
People from Kowloon